The men's regu sepak takraw competition at the 2010 Asian Games in Guangzhou was held from 22 November to 24 November at the Haizhu Sports Center.

Four teams Thailand, Malaysia, Myanmar and China played in a round-robin competition, leaving no true championship game. Thailand won the gold medal after winning all three matches.

Squads

Results 
All times are China Standard Time (UTC+08:00)

|-
|22 November||09:00
|align=right|
|align=center|2–0
|align=left|
|21–18||21–18||
|-
|22 November||09:00
|align=right|
|align=center|0–2
|align=left|
|10–21||11–21||
|-
|22 November||19:30
|align=right|
|align=center|2–0
|align=left|
|21–13||21–10||
|-
|22 November||19:30
|align=right|
|align=center|2–1
|align=left|
|17–21||21–13||15–9
|-
|23 November||15:30
|align=right|
|align=center|2–0
|align=left|
|21–16||21–12||
|-
|24 November||14:30
|align=right|
|align=center|0–2
|align=left|
|12–21||19–21||

References 

Results

External links 
Official Website

Sepak takraw at the 2010 Asian Games